The 1982 Temple Owls football team was an American football team that represented Temple University as an independent during the 1982 NCAA Division I-A football season. In its 13th season under head coach Wayne Hardin, the team compiled a 4–7 record and outscored opponents by a total of 220 to 202. The team played its home games at Veterans Stadium and Franklin Field in Philadelphia. 

The team's statistical leaders included Tim Riordan with 1,840 passing yards, Harold Harmon with 883 rushing yards, Reggie Brown with 591 receiving yards, and Bob Clauser with 62 points scored.

Schedule

References

Temple
Temple Owls football seasons
Temple Owls football